Ha Seung-youn (born May 19, 2000) is a South Korean curler from Uijeongbu. She is the skip of the Chuncheon City Hall curling team. While playing with Kim Min-ji, she won a silver medal at the 2020 World Junior Curling Championships.

Career
Ha joined Team Kim in 2019. The team lost the final of the 2019 Korean Women's Curling Championship in June 2019 to the Gim Un-chi rink after Kim missed her last shot and gave up a steal of two in the tenth end. The team won the Tour Challenge Tier 2 event Grand Slam of Curling event after a strong 9–2 win over Jestyn Murphy. This qualified them for the Canadian Open in Yorkton, Saskatchewan. There, they defeated higher ranked teams such as three time Scotties champion Rachel Homan, 2013 world champion Eve Muirhead and 2020 Scotties champion Kerri Einarson. They made it all the way to the final before losing to the Anna Hasselborg rink in an extra end. They also made it all the way to the final of the 2020 World Junior Curling Championships, where they lost to Canada's Mackenzie Zacharias. On the World Curling Tour, they won the Boundary Ford Curling Classic, finished fourth at the inaugural WCT Uiseong International Curling Cup, made the quarterfinals at the Red Deer Curling Classic and missed the playoffs at the 2019 Curlers Corner Autumn Gold Curling Classic and the 2019 Canad Inns Women's Classic.

The Kim rink began the abbreviated 2020–21 season at the 2020 Korean National Women's Curling Championship. There, they qualified for the playoffs with a 5–1 record before losing both of their playoff games to the Kim Eun-jung and Gim Un-chi rinks, settling for third. Later that season, Team Kim competed in the only two Grand Slam events of the season, which were played in a "curling bubble" in Calgary, Alberta, with no spectators, to avoid the spread of the coronavirus. The team missed the playoffs at both the 2021 Champions Cup and the 2021 Players' Championship.

The 2021–22 season began in June for Team Kim as they competed in the 2021 Korean Curling Championships to decide who would get the chance to represent Korea at the 2022 Winter Olympics in Beijing, China. In the first of three rounds, the team went a perfect 4–0 in the round robin before losing in the semifinal to the Gim Un-chi rink. They rebounded with a win over Kim Ji-su in the third place game. In the second round, they went 4–2, however, because Team Kim Eun-jung won both the first and second rounds, they became the national champions. Ha later competed in the Gangwon qualifier for the 2021 Korean Mixed Doubles Curling Championship with partner Park Sang-woo, however, failed to reach the national championship after a 2–3 record. Through the fall of 2021, skip Kim Min-ji was absent from the team due to winning the Mixed Doubles championship with Lee Ki-jeong. This moved the team's second Kim Hye-rin up to skip with Ha remaining at the third position. The team played in two Grand Slam events, the 2021 Masters and the 2021 National, finishing with a 1–3 record at both. They only played in one more event during the season, the Boundary Ford Curling Classic, where they lost in the final to Team Gim. In March 2022, Kim Min-ji would move to Gyeonggi Province to join Team Gim, moving Ha up to skip on the Chuncheon City Hall team.

Personal life
Ha attended Korea National Open University.

Teams

References

External links

Living people
South Korean female curlers
2000 births
Sportspeople from Gyeonggi Province
People from Uijeongbu
21st-century South Korean women
Competitors at the 2023 Winter World University Games
Medalists at the 2023 Winter World University Games